Harmonica's Howl is a 2013 Brazilian drama film directed by Bruno Safadi.  It stars Leandra Leal, Jiddú Pinheiro and Mariana Ximenes. The film premiered at the 42nd International Film Festival Rotterdam.

The film is part of the "Operation Sonia Silk", a series of three feature-length films produced cooperatively, with the same cast and crew, co-produced by Canal Brasil and Teleimage. It tells the story of Antônia and Pedro, a couple that is facing problems in the relationship after the arrival of Luana. The two women fall in love and live a love story.

Cast
 Jiddu Pinheiro as Pedro
 Leandra Leal as Luana
 Mariana Ximenes as Antônia

Production

Filming
Filming took place in Rio de Janeiro,  shooting locations included the port of Rio de Janeiro, the Casa das Canoas designed by Oscar Niemeyer and a beach in Niterói.

References

External links
 

Brazilian drama films
Brazilian LGBT-related films
2013 drama films
2013 LGBT-related films
2013 films
Films shot in Rio de Janeiro (city)
Lesbian-related films
LGBT-related drama films
2010s Portuguese-language films